Oddballs is a company which sells underwear, socks, and other clothing.

History 
The company was launched in September 2014 by footballer Steve Harper, rugby player Richard Metcalfe, and former CEO of Newcastle Falcons Paul Varley. It was established after Harper heard that his friend Jonás Gutiérrez had testicular cancer.

Products 
Oddballs manufactures licensed clothing. In 2018, it manufactured Burnley F.C. underwear.

Charity 
The company donates 10% from the sale price of each pair of underwear to testicular cancer charities, and distributes guides for one to check themselves for signs of testicular cancer with its products. By 2021, over £600,000 had been raised.

References 

Clothing companies established in 2014
2014 establishments in England